English Sikhs number over 520,000 people and account for 0.92% of England's population in 2021, forming the country's fourth-largest religious group. In 2006 there were 352 gurdwaras in England. The largest Sikh populations in the U.K. are in the West Midlands and Greater London.

History
The permanent arrival of Sikhism in England is dated to 1850 A.D. with the arrival of Maharajah Duleep Singh (last ruler of the Sikh Empire).  The first Sikh place of worship, called a Gurdwara, was opened in 1911 in London and this was partly funded by the Maharaja of Patiala. Prior to this the first Sikh Society called Khalsa Jatha was formed in 1908.  

In 2019, the statue of Sikh soldier was unveiled in the West Yorkshire to commemorate the Sikhs martyrs in the World War I and World War II.

Demographics

Geographical Distribution

National and Ethnic  Origins
Between 2001 and 2011, the proportion of English Sikhs who identified as Indian declined from 91.6% to 74.0%, while the proportion of English Sikhs who identified as "Other Asian" rose from 4.6% to 12.0% and the proportion of English Sikhs who identified as "Other Ethnic group" rose from 0.7% to 9.5%.

Sikh Schools
There are currently 13 Sikh Schools in England that teach the national curriculum alongside Sikh values. These schools are often oversubscribed and outperform regular schools, for example the Nishkam High School in Birmingham was recently rated by Ofsted as outstanding in every area.  The Nishkam School Trust is also developing a sister school in West London, which is an area with a large Sikh community, which is due to open in September 2016.

The schools include:

 Akaal Primary School, Derby
 Atam Academy, Romford
 Falcons Primary School, Leicester
 Guru Gobind Singh Khalsa College, Chigwell
 Guru Nanak Sikh Academy, Hayes
 Khalsa Primary School, Slough
 Khalsa Primary School, Southall
 Khalsa Secondary Academy, Stoke Poges
 Nishkam Nursery & Primary School, Birmingham
 Nishkam High School, Birmingham
 Nishkam School West London, Isleworth
 Seva School, Coventry
 The British Sikh School, Wolverhampton

Gurdwaras 

Southall, in London, is home to the largest Sikh temple outside India, known as Gurdwara Sri Guru Singh Sabha. It opened in 2003 after almost three years construction and a cost of £17 million. Another large Gurdwara in Gravesend began construction in 2001, and was officially opened in November 2010 .  In Sunderland, a former Church of England church has been transformed into a Sikh Gurdwara by the Sunderland Sikh Association.

Many cities, especially those with large Sikh communities, now have several Gurdwaras to cater to their growing congregations.  For example, Bradford is a city that now has 6 Gurdwaras.  Many Gurdwaras will have had other uses and have been converted from industrial buildings to even former churches that have closed down.  Increasingly, Gurdwaras are being purposely built, The Guru Gobind Singh Gurdwara in Bradford is an example of a purpose built Gurdwara.

Notable British Sikh organisations 
In addition to Gurdwaras there are now a variety of additional organisations which have been setup by Sikhs to support the community:

 British Sikh Report
 City Sikhs 
 Gurdwara Sahib Leamington and Warwick
 Guru Nanak Nishkam Sevak Jatha
 Gurdwara Sri Guru Singh Sabha Southall
 Guru Nanak Gurdwara Smethwick
 Guru Nanak Darbar Gurdwara
 Nishkam SWAT
 Sangat TV
 Sikh Pioneers & Sikh Light Infantry Association UK
 Sikh Channel
 Sikh Federation (UK)
 The Sikh Awards

Sikh Media 
Sikhs in England have managed to establish a range of media outlets to propagate and encourage dialogue between Sikhs across the country, predominantly in Punjabi, although increasingly media is produced in English to include the new generation. Many Sikhs still speak Punjabi as a first and second language.  In England there are currently no less than 4 Sky channels including, Sikh Channel, Sikh TV, Akaal Channel and Sangat TV, all are also broadcast worldwide and on the internet.

In radio there are numerous stations broadcast on analogue in areas with large Sikh communities as well as internationally on the Sky platform, since 2001 Sukh Sagar on Sky channel 0150 is one such station that was also the world's first 24-hour Gurbani (Sikh prayer) radio station.

See also
List of British Sikhs
Sikhism in the United Kingdom
Sikhism in Scotland
Sikhism in Wales
Religion in England
Gurdwaras in England

References

External links
National Network of British Sikh Professionals
Gurdwara Sri Guru Singh Sabha's official website

Information Portal of the Sikh faith